People with the surname Hugill:

Andrew Hugill (born 1957), British composer
Ashley Hugill (born 1994), English professional snooker player
Glenn Hugill (born 1970), British television presenter and producer
John Hugill (1881–1971), Canadian lawyer and politician
Jordan Hugill (born 1992), English footballer
Robert Hugill (composer) (born 1955), English composer
Stanley James Hugill (1906–1992), English folk singer used stage name Stan Hugill
George C. Hugill, founder of the Hugill & Blatherwick architectural firm